Jenna Martin (born March 31, 1988) is a Canadian track and field athlete who specialises in the 400 metres. She competed in the 400 metres event at the 2012 Summer Olympics, reaching the semifinals. She was born in Liverpool, Nova Scotia. She was the Canadian national champion in the 400 m in 2012 and set a personal best of 51.53 seconds that year in Calgary.

International competitions

References

External links
 
 
 
 

1988 births
Living people
Canadian female sprinters
People from Queens County, Nova Scotia
Sportspeople from Nova Scotia
Olympic track and field athletes of Canada
Athletes (track and field) at the 2012 Summer Olympics
World Athletics Championships athletes for Canada
Competitors at the 2011 Summer Universiade
Olympic female sprinters